Clara's echymipera (Echymipera clara), or Clara's spiny bandicoot or white-lipped bandicoot, is a species of marsupial in the family Peramelidae. It is found in West Papua, Indonesia and Papua New Guinea. Its natural habitat is subtropical or tropical dry forests.

It is hunted for human consumption in New Guinea.

References

Peramelemorphs
Marsupials of New Guinea
Mammals of Papua New Guinea
Mammals of Western New Guinea
Least concern biota of Oceania
Mammals described in 1932
Taxonomy articles created by Polbot
Taxa named by Georg Hermann Wilhelm Stein